Cherrystone is an unincorporated community in Northampton County, Virginia, United States.

References

Unincorporated communities in Northampton County, Virginia
Unincorporated communities in Virginia